This is a list of the Dutch Top 40 number-one singles of 1992.

See also
1992 in music
List of number-one hits (Netherlands)

References

1992 in the Netherlands
1992 record charts
1992